Telamonia is a genus of jumping spiders that was first described by Tamerlan Thorell in 1887. They are colorful spiders, with patterns that vary considerably between sexes and species. Two longitudinal stripes along the abdomen are common, and the carapace is often colored. They have a slender opisthosoma and long legs.

Species

 it contains thirty-nine species and two subspecies, found in the rain forests of Africa and Asia, including Papua New Guinea:
Telamonia agapeta (Thorell, 1881) – New Guinea
Telamonia annulipes Peckham & Peckham, 1907 – Borneo
Telamonia bombycina (Simon, 1902) – Borneo
Telamonia borreyi Berland & Millot, 1941 – Mali
Telamonia b. minor Berland & Millot, 1941 – Mali
Telamonia caprina (Simon, 1903) – China, Vietnam
Telamonia coeruleostriata (Doleschall, 1859) – Indonesia (Ambon)
Telamonia comosissima (Simon, 1886) – Congo
Telamonia cristata Peckham & Peckham, 1907 – Philippines
Telamonia dimidiata (Simon, 1899) – India, Bhutan, Malaysia, Indonesia (Sumatra)
Telamonia dissimilis Próchniewicz, 1990 – Bhutan
Telamonia elegans (Thorell, 1887) – Myanmar, Vietnam, Indonesia
Telamonia festiva Thorell, 1887 (type) – Myanmar to Indonesia (Java)
Telamonia f. nigrina (Simon, 1903) – Vietnam
Telamonia formosa (Simon, 1902) – Indonesia (Java)
Telamonia hasselti (Thorell, 1878) – Myanmar to Indonesia (Sulawesi)
Telamonia jolensis (Simon, 1902) – Philippines
Telamonia laecta Próchniewicz, 1990 – Bhutan
Telamonia latruncula (Thorell, 1877) – Indonesia (Sulawesi)
Telamonia leopoldi Roewer, 1938 – New Guinea
Telamonia livida (Karsch, 1880) – Philippines
Telamonia luteocincta (Thorell, 1891) – Malaysia
Telamonia luxiensis Peng, Yin, Yan & Kim, 1998 – China
Telamonia mandibulata Hogg, 1915 – New Guinea
Telamonia masinloc Barrion & Litsinger, 1995 – Philippines
Telamonia mundula (Thorell, 1877) – Indonesia (Sulawesi)
Telamonia mustelina Simon, 1901 – China (Hong Kong)
Telamonia parangfestiva Barrion & Litsinger, 1995 – Philippines
Telamonia peckhami Thorell, 1891 – India (Nicobar Is.)
Telamonia prima Próchniewicz, 1990 – Bhutan
Telamonia resplendens Peckham & Peckham, 1907 – Borneo
Telamonia scalaris (Thorell, 1881) – Indonesia (Moluccas)
Telamonia setosa (Karsch, 1880) – Philippines
Telamonia shepardi Barrion, Barrion-Dupo & Heong, 2013 – China
Telamonia sponsa (Simon, 1902) – Sri Lanka
Telamonia trabifera (Thorell, 1881) – New Guinea
Telamonia trinotata Simon, 1903 – Equatorial Guinea
Telamonia trochilus (Doleschall, 1859) – Indonesia (Java)
Telamonia vidua Hogg, 1915 – New Guinea
Telamonia virgata Simon, 1903 – Gabon
Telamonia vlijmi Prószyński, 1984 – China, Korea, Japan

References

External links

 Salticidae.org: Diagnostic drawings and photographs

Salticidae
Salticidae genera
Spiders of Africa
Spiders of Asia
Spiders of Oceania
Taxa named by Tamerlan Thorell